Monadnock Lifetime Products, Inc. is a weapons manufacturer providing equipment to law enforcement and private security companies since 1958. Monadnock produce several models of police baton. The company is a subsidiary under Safariland, LLC

Company products
Monadnock manufactures several types of police baton, including traditional straight batons, long riot sticks, side-handle nightsticks including the PR-24, and both friction-locking and mechanically locking telescoping batons.

References

External links 
 

Manufacturing companies established in 1958
Weapons manufacturing companies
Companies based in Cheshire County, New Hampshire
1958 establishments in New Hampshire